Vasily Ivanovich Kachalov (– 30 September 1948), was one of Russia's most renowned actors. He worked closely and often with Konstantin Stanislavski. He led the so-called Kachalov Group within the Moscow Art Theatre. It was Kachalov who played Hamlet in the Symbolist production of 1911.

His father was Ivan Shverubovich, a Belarusian Orthodox priest from Vilna. His schoolmates at Vilna Gymnasium included revolutionary Felix Dzerzhinsky and composer Konstantinas Galkauskas. In 1896, he left the law department of Saint Petersburg University in order to pursue an acting career. After four years of touring the Russian provinces and a brief stint at the Suvorin Theatre, Kachalov made his debut at the Moscow Art Theatre as Tsar Berendey in The Snow Maiden (spring 1900).

The snow maiden was played by Stanislavski's wife, Maria Lilina, who fell in love with Kachalov; she described their affair as "a touch of private happiness". Another of his lovers was Alisa Koonen. He met his wife, actress Nina Litovtseva, when they were acting in the Kazan Drama Theatre, one of Russia's oldest.

Kachalov was greatly admired for his "magnetic" voice. He played Baron Tuzenbach after Vsevolod Meyerhold's departure from the theatre. In the original 1904 production of The Cherry Orchard he appeared as Trofimov. He starred in Vladimir Nemirovich-Danchenko's production of Ivanov later that year. All in all, he took more than 50 roles in Stanislavski's company.

After the Russian Revolution, the Kachalov Group went touring Central Europe and did not return until the summer of 1921, under pressure from the theatre's founders.

Kachalov was named one of the first People's Artists of the USSR after the title was instituted in 1936 and received a Stalin Prize in 1943. He was also the recipient of the two Orders of Lenin. The Kazan State Theatre was given his name in 1948.

The Russian director and puppeteer, Sergey Obraztsov, described seeing Kachalov on stage:

“That matchless voice of his sounded different each time. Different too was that amazing process of creating a phrase, and every visual image evoked by the word. One had the impression that Kachalov was not merely speaking but thinking aloud, and that the words one heard were only a part of what he was seeing with his inner eye. For that reason people did not merely listen to Kachalov, they watched what he was talking about.”

Notable performances 

1900 – Snow Maiden by  Ostrovsky, directed by Stanislavski
1900 – When We Dead Awaken by Ibsen, directed by Nemirovich-Danchenko
1900 – The Death of Ivan the Terrible, by Al. Tolstoy, dir. by Stanislavski and Nemirovich-Danchenko
1901 – Three Sisters by  Chekhov, directed by Stanislavski   
1901 – The Wild Duck by Ibsen  
1901 – The Seagull by  Chekhov, directed by Stanislavski 
1902 – Three Sisters, by   Chekhov 
1902 – The Lower Depths, by Gorky 
1903 – The Pillars of Society, by Ibsen 
1903 – Julius Caesar, by Shakespeare 
1904 – The Cherry Orchard, by Chekhov 
1904 – Ivanov, by Chekhov 
1905 – Ghosts, by Ibsen 
1906 – Brand, by Ibsen 
1907 – Boris Godunov, by Pushkin
1908 – Rosmersholm, by Ibsen 
1910 – The Brothers Karamazov, by Dostoevsky 
1910 – A Month in the Country, by Turgenev 
1911 – Hamlet, Shakespeare, directed by Gordon Craig 
1918 – Uncle Vanya, by Anton Chekhov 
1935 – Enemies, by Gorky

References 

1875 births
1948 deaths
19th-century male actors from the Russian Empire
20th-century Russian male actors
Male actors from Vilnius
People from Vilna Governorate
Honored Artists of the RSFSR
People's Artists of the RSFSR
People's Artists of the USSR
Stalin Prize winners
Recipients of the Order of Lenin
Recipients of the Order of the Red Banner of Labour
Male actors from the Russian Empire
Russian people of Belarusian descent
Russian drama teachers
Russian male stage actors
Soviet drama teachers
Soviet male stage actors
Spoken word artists
Deaths from lung cancer in Russia
Deaths from lung cancer in the Soviet Union
Burials at Novodevichy Cemetery